Paul Henry Castner (February 16, 1897 – March 3, 1986) was a professional baseball pitcher. He appeared in six games in Major League Baseball for the Chicago White Sox in 1923, all in relief. In 10 innings pitched, Castner gave up 14 hits and 5 walks without striking out a batter.

Castner was an alumnus of the University of Notre Dame.

College Hockey Head Coaching Record

References

Sources

Major League Baseball pitchers
Chicago White Sox players
Notre Dame Fighting Irish baseball players
Notre Dame Fighting Irish football players
Notre Dame Fighting Irish men's ice hockey players
Baseball players from Saint Paul, Minnesota
Ice hockey people from Saint Paul, Minnesota
Players of American football from Saint Paul, Minnesota
1897 births
1986 deaths